Johnny Hudgins (May 5, 1896 – 1990) was a vaudeville performer. He sometimes performed in blackface. Hudgins was nicknamed the Wah-Wah Man (wah-wah) and was known for his mime performances accompanied by accomplished trumpeters. He was friends with fellow vaudevillian Josephine Baker who he performed with in the show Chocolate Dandies.  He was also in the show Lucky Sambo. He used burnt cork to blacken his face and performed with exaggerated white lips in many of his performances. His performances drew rave reviews and imitators. Hudgins sought to copyright his performance art.

Hudgins performed with Florence Mills and was accompanied by trumpeters including Doc Cheatham, Johnny Dunn, Joe Smith (trumpeter), Louis Metcalf and Rex Stewart.

Hudgins was born in Baltimore, Maryland.

Career
Hudgins performed in Harlem's clubs, toured America, and toured Europe where he was referred to as a "colored" Charlie Chaplin.  He also performed with his wife Mildred Martien and Fredi Washington. Martien was lifelong friends with Josephine Baker.

He was photographed by Edward Elcha. Emory University has a collection of his papers.

Filmography
Charleston Parade, Sur un air de charleston, (1927) with Catherine Hessling 
 A Night in Dixie (1926)

References

External links
Pathé film of Hudgins performing
Jean Renoir's Renoir Charleston with Catherine Hessling and Johnny Hudgins (1927)
Hudgins at 2:55 mark from A Night in Dixie (1926)

Stuart A. Rose Manuscript, Archives, and Rare Book Library, Emory University: Johnny Hudgins papers, 1927-1988

1896 births
1990 deaths
Vaudeville performers
Male actors from Baltimore